Thomas M. Allen (October 21, 1797 – October 10, 1871) was a clergyman who played a prominent role in establishing the Christian Church (Disciples of Christ) in Missouri.

He was born in Warren County, Virginia (then part of Shenandoah County) in 1797. He studied law at Transylvania University, and married Rebecca Russell in 1819. He was subsequently ordained to the ministry in Fayette County, Kentucky, later moving to Boone County, Missouri, in 1836. He achieved recognition outside of the church as well, serving as the president of the board of curators of the University of Missouri in 1839, 1841, and 1864. Also instrumental in the founding of Columbia College (Columbia, Missouri) in 1851 as Christian Women's College. It was renamed in 1970 when the college became co-educational.

He died in 1871.

References
Who Was Who in America, Historical Volume 1607-1896. Chicago: Marquis Who's Who, 1967.

1797 births
1871 deaths
19th-century Christian clergy
American Disciples of Christ
Christian Church (Disciples of Christ) clergy
Transylvania University alumni
People from Columbia, Missouri
People from Lexington, Kentucky
People from Warren County, Virginia
University of Missouri curators
Columbia College (Missouri) people
19th-century American clergy